The  was a Japanese domain of the Edo period. It was associated with Bizen Province in modern-day Okayama Prefecture.
 
In the han system, Okayama was a political and economic abstraction based on periodic cadastral surveys and projected agricultural yields.  In other words, the domain was defined in terms of kokudaka, not land area. This was different from the feudalism of the West.

History

The domain sided with the Kyoto government during the Boshin War.

List of daimyōs 
The hereditary daimyōs were head of the clan and head of the domain.

Kobayakawa clan, 1600–1602 (tozama; 510,000 koku)

Hideaki

Ikeda clan, 1603–1632 (tozama/jun-shinpan; 280,000 → 380,000 → 315,000 koku)

Tadatsugu
Tadakatsu

Ikeda clan, 1632–1871 (tozama; 315,000 koku)

Mitsumasa
Tsunamasa
Tsugumasa
Munemasa
Harumasa
Narimasa
Naritoshi
Yoshimasa
Mochimasa
Ikeda Akimasa

Genealogy (simplified; Ikeda clan – Okayama)

Ikeda Tsuneoki (1536–1584)
Terumasa, 1st daimyō of Himeji (1565–1613)
Toshitaka, 2nd daimyō of Himeji (1584–1616)
 I. Mitsumasa, 1st daimyō of Okayama (2nd creation. cr. 1632) (1609–1682; r. 1632–1672)
 II. Tsunamasa, 2nd daimyō of Okayama (2nd creation) (1638–1714; r. 1672–1714)
 III. Tsugumasa, 3rd daimyō of Okayama (2nd creation) (1702–1776; r. 1714–1752)
 IV. Munemasa, 4th daimyō of Okayama (2nd creation) (1727–1764; r. 1752–1764)
 V. Harumasa, 5th daimyō of Okayama (2nd creation) (1750–1819; r. 1764–1794)
  VI. Narimasa, 6th daimyō of Okayama (2nd creation) (1773–1833; r. 1794–1829)
Sagara Nagahiro, 12th daimyō of Hitoyoshi (1752–1813)
Sagara Yorinori, 13th daimyō of Hitoyoshi (1774–1856)
Sagara Yoriyuki, 14th daimyō of Hitoyoshi (1798–1850)
 X. Akimasa, 10th daimyō of Okayama (2nd creation) 1st Marquess (1836–1903; r. 1868–1869, Governor of Okayama: 1869–1871, Marquess: 1884)
Norimasa, 13th family head and 2nd Marquess (1865–1909; 11th family head and 2nd Marquess: 1903–1909)
 Tadamasa, 14th family head and 3rd Marquess (1895–1920; 12th family head and 3rd Marquess: 1909–1920).
Nobumasa, 15th family head and 4th Marquess (1904–1988; 13th family head and 4th Marquess: 1920–1947, 13th family head: 1947–1988)
 Takamasa, 16th family head (1926–2012; 14th family head: 1988–2012). m. Princess Atsuko of the Imperial House of Japan (b. 1931). No issue; the family became extinct after his death.
 I. Tadatsugu, 1st daimyō of Okayama (1st creation. cr. 1603) (1599–1615; r. 1603–1615)
 II. Tadakatsu, 2nd daimyō of Okayama (1st creation) (1602–1632; r. 1615–1632)
 III. Mitsunaka, 3rd daimyō of Okayama (1st creation), 1st daimyō of Tottori (3rd creation) (1630–1693; r. 1632)
Nakazumi, 1st daimyō of Tottori-Shinden (1650–1722)
Yoshiyasu, 3rd daimyō of Tottori (3rd creation) (1687–1739)
Muneyasu, 4th daimyō of Tottori (3rd creation) (1717–1747)
Shigenobu, 5th daimyō of Tottori (3rd creation) (1746–1783)
Harumichi, 6th daimyō of Tottori (3rd creation) (1768–1798)
Iyohime Chikako (1792–1824) m. Shimazu Narioki, 10th daimyō of Satsuma (1791–1859)
  VII. Naritoshi, 7th daimyō of Okayama (2nd creation) (1811–1842; r. 1829–1842)
Motosuke (1559–1584)
Yoshiyuki (1577–1618)
Yoshinari (1605–1676)
Yoshitaka (1641–1696)
Yoshimichi (1681–1743)
Masamichi, 3rd daimyō of Kamogata (1714–1792)
Masanao, 5th daimyō of Kamogata (1746–1818)
Masami, 6th daimyō of Kamogata (1772–1819)
Masayoshi, 8th daimyō of Kamogata (1811–1847)
Utako (1830–1877) m.  VIII. Yoshimasa, 8th daimyō of Okayama (2nd creation) (1823–1893; r. 1842–1863. Son of the 5th daimyō of Nakatsu.) 
  Hisako (1848-1868) m. IX. Mochimasa, 9th daimyō of Okayama (2nd creation) (1839–1899; r. 1863–1868. Son of Tokugawa Nariaki, daimyō of Mito.)

See also 
 List of Han
 Abolition of the han system

References

External links
 "Okayama" at Edo 300 

Domains of Japan